Laban was a 1980s synthpop duo consisting of Lecia Jønsson and Ivan Pedersen. Both members were born in Denmark and originally sang in Danish, before moving on to English language releases. They went on to limited international success with the releases of two albums, as well as singles such as "Love in Siberia" and "Caught by Surprise".

The duo formed in 1982, and recorded the song "Hvor Ska' Vi Sove I Nat?" ("Where Shall We Sleep Tonight?") in 1982, a cover version of Ricchi e Poveri's "Sarà perché ti amo". A manager called Cai Leitner heard the song, and two days later it was released as a single. They recorded another cover song that year, called "Jeg Kan Li' Dig Alligevel" ("I Like You Anyway"), originally performed by the German pop group Hot Shot as "Angel from Paradise". In 1986 they released "Love in Siberia" which spent 4 weeks in the Billboard Hot 100, peaking at Number 88, and which launched the pair to even bigger international success, especially all around Europe. It resulted in an LP called "Caught by Surprise", in addition to a single of the same name.

The first album also included the single releases of "Donna Donna" and "Ch-Ch-Cherrie", allowing the duo to release a second international album in 1987. The second album had more of a rock music feel than the first and failed to do as well. With their popularity fading, Laban split up in 1988.

Discography

Albums
 Laban (1982)
 Laban 2 (1983)
 Laban 3 (1984)
 Laban's bedste (compilation) (1985)
 Laban 4 (1985)
 Caught by Surprise (1986)
 Laban 5 (1987)
 Roulette (1987)
 Greatest Hits (compilation) (1988)
 De største narrestreger (compilation) (1997)
 De 36 bedste narrestreger (compilation) (2009)
 Komplet & rariteter (compilation) (2010)

Singles 
 "Hvor ska' vi sove i nat?" (Where Are We Going Sleep Tonight?)
 "Meget bedre nu/Det jeg føler for dig" (Much Better Now/What I Feel for You)
 "Came-camera"
 "Kun et sekund" (Danish version of "Caught by Surprise")
 "Kold som is" (Danish version of "Love in Siberia")
 "Donna Donna"
 "Ch-Ch-Cherrie"
 "Love in Siberia"
 "Caught By Surprise"
 "Russian Roulette"
 "Fange i natten" (Danish version of "Prisoner of the Night")
 "Prisoner of the Night"
 "Down on Your Knees"
 "Don't Stop"
 "I Close My Eyes and Count to Ten"

References

Danish musical groups
Danish new wave musical groups
English-language singers from Denmark
Musical groups established in 1982
Musical groups disestablished in 1988